Mahmud Efendi Kaziu was one of the delegates of the Albanian Declaration of Independence, where he represented Peqin, his hometown.

References

20th-century Albanian politicians
19th-century Albanian politicians
All-Albanian Congress delegates
People from Peqin
People from Manastir vilayet